The Lucky Lady is a 1926 American silent romance film produced by Famous Players-Lasky, distributed by Paramount Pictures, directed by Raoul Walsh, and starring Greta Nissen, Lionel Barrymore, William Collier, Jr., and Marc McDermott.

Walsh and Barrymore and their families knew each other going back to their adolescence in the Victorian era of the 1880s and 1890s

Plot
As described in a film magazine review, this is a tale of a beauty who lavished her charms upon one man for revenge and upon another for love. It happens in a mythical kingdom where a lovely princess is chafing against the restraint of a convent. She sneaks away, meets a young American man, flirts with him, and falls in love. At the same time, she poses as an alluring vampire and flirts with the wild-living nobleman whom she is supposed to marry but does not love. The prime minister, fearing for the marriage plans of the nobleman and the princess, banishes the young American and the vampire, who is really the princess. The two journey to America and live happily ever afterwards.

Cast

Preservation
Contrary to some sources, The Lucky Lady is not a lost film. A print survives in the Library of Congress.

See also
Lionel Barrymore filmography

References

External links

Lantern slide coming attractions advertisement

1926 films
American silent feature films
American black-and-white films
Films directed by Raoul Walsh
Paramount Pictures films
Famous Players-Lasky films
1920s romance films
American romance films
1920s American films